Oedemerinae are a subfamily of the false blister beetles (family Oedemeridae), also known as pollen-feeding beetles. The Nacerdinae are sometimes merged here.

The phylogeny of this family is not robustly deduced in detail. While traditionally three tribes are accepted, one is considered monotypic and another has only two genera. Though this may well be warranted, the evolutionary relationships the Oedemerinae are generally in need of review, particularly considering the number of genera treated as basal or of entirely uncertain placement.

Tribes and selected genera
The subfamily Oedemerinae contains the following genera:

 Tribe Asclerini Semenov, 1894
 Afrochitona
 Alloxantha Seidlitz, 1899
 Anacerdochroa Svihla, 1986
 Ananca Fairmaire & Germain, 1863
 Apterosessinia Blair, 1926
 Asclerosibutia Pic, 1914
 Baculipalpus Broun, 1880
 Chitona W.Schmidt, 1844
 Colobostomoides Svihla, 1983
 Copidita LeConte, 1866
 Diplectrus Kirsch, 1866
 Ditylomorphula Svihla, 1986
 Ditylomorphus Svihla, 1986
 Dohrnia Malm, 1874
 Eobia Semenov, 1894
 Eumecomera Arnett, 1951
 Heliocis Arnett, 1951
 Hypasclera Kirsch, 1866
 Indasclera Svihla, 1980
 Ischnomera Stephens, 1832
 Koniaphassa Hudson, 1975
 Mecopselaphus Solier, 1849
 Melananthia Blair, 1926
 Melananthoides Vazquez, 1996
 Microsessinia Pic, 1922
 Nacatrorus Vazquez, 1996
 Nacerdochroa Reitter, 1893
 Oxacis LeConte, 1866
 Oxycopis Arnett, 1951
 Parisopalpus Hudson, 1975
 Paroxacis Arnett, 1951
 Platylytra Fairmaire & Germain, 1863
 Probosca W.Schmidt, 1846
 Pseudohyperasclera
 Pseudolycus Guérin, 1833
 Rhinoplatia Horn, 1868
 Selenopalpus White, 1846
 Sessinia Pascoe, 1863
 Sisenes Champion, 1889
 Thelyphassa Pascoe, 1876
 Vasaces Champion, 1889
 Xanthochroina Ganglbauer, 1881
 Tribe Oedemerini Latreille, 1810
 Dryopomera Fairmaire, 1897
 Oedemera Olivier, 1789
 Tribe Stenostomatini Mulsant, 1858
 Stenostoma Agassiz, 1850

References

Oedemeridae